Jose Maria Carneiro da Silva, (born September 20, 1986 in Sena Madureira, Brazil), known as Neném, is a Brazilian football midfielder currently playing for Atlético Acreano.

Career
Neném played for União de Rondonópolis and Rio Branco, before he signed with Bulgarian Litex Lovech. After a short loan period at Botev Vratsa, he returned to Brazil, continuing his career with local clubs.

References

External links
 Profile at wspsoccer.com

1986 births
Living people
Brazilian footballers
PFC Litex Lovech players
FC Botev Vratsa players
First Professional Football League (Bulgaria) players
Brazilian expatriate footballers
Expatriate footballers in Bulgaria
Association football midfielders
União Esporte Clube players
Sportspeople from Acre (state)